Carlo Gervasoni (born 4 January 1982) is a former Italian footballer who played as a defender. His career ended in 2011 after a ban from football due to his involvement in the 2011 Italian football match-fixing scandal; the ban is set to end in 2018.

Career
Gervasoni started his career at a small Lombard club Como. In mid-2001, Gervasoni and Marco Mallus joined South Tyrol of Serie C2; concurrently Luigi Crisopulli returned to Como. During his three seasons with Tyrol, Gervasoni was a regular starter. In June 2004 Como bought back Gervasoni outright for €120,000 but sold to Geona for free. But Genoa immediately sold him to Verona in another co-ownership deal, for €500,000. Although he just played 24 matches, Verona sign him permanently. After he played another 24 matches, he left for fellow Serie B Bari in co-ownership deal. Luigi Anaclerio also joined Verona also in co-ownership on the same day. In June Verona bought back Gervasoni.

In August 2007, he joined Albinoleffe in another co-ownership deal, for €560,000. He signed a 3-year contract. Gervasoni back to play as a regular starter and he secured a permanent deal in June 2008 for another €95,000.

On 31 August 2009, Gervasoni was exchanged with Dario Passoni. After the relegation and bankruptcy of Mantova, he joined Cremonese. In January 2011 he left for Serie B club Piacenza. Francesco Bini also joined Cremonese in exchange.

He was banned from football activity for five years due to involvement in the 2011 Italian football scandal; an additional one-year and 8 months was added in May 2012; four more months were added in August, meaning Gervasoni will serve a 7-year ban.

References

External links
  Official Albinoleffe Player Profile
 

1982 births
Living people
People from Legnano
Italian footballers
Footballers from Lombardy
Como 1907 players
Hellas Verona F.C. players
S.S.C. Bari players
U.C. AlbinoLeffe players
Mantova 1911 players
Serie B players
Association football defenders
Sportspeople from the Metropolitan City of Milan